The Patriotic Salvation Movement (MPS) is the ruling political party in Chad.

History
After Idriss Déby, an army commander who participated in an unsuccessful plot against President Hissène Habré in 1989, fled to Sudan, he and his supporters, known as the 1 April Movement, operated from Sudan with Libyan backing and carried out attacks across the border into Chad. The MPS was founded in Sudan on 10 March 1990 through the merger of the 1 April Movement with other anti-Habre groups in exile. After a successful offensive in November 1990, Déby and the MPS came to power on 2 December 1990, when their forces entered N'Djamena, the Chadian capital.

Déby was the MPS candidate in the 1996 presidential election and won in a second round. He was again the MPS candidate in the presidential election of 20 May 2001, receiving 63.2% of the vote. In the parliamentary election held on 21 April 2002, the MPS won according to IPU Parline 113 out of 155 seats. In the May 2006 presidential election, Déby was re-elected with 64.7% of the vote.

Electoral history

Presidential elections

National Assembly elections

See also 
 Agnes Allafi

Notes

References

Political parties in Chad
Political parties established in 1990